Richard Worsop (fl. 1406–1407), of Lincoln, was an English politician.

He was a Member (MP) of the Parliament of England for Lincoln in 1406 and 1407.

References

14th-century births
15th-century deaths
English MPs 1406
People from Lincoln, England
English MPs 1407
Members of the Parliament of England (pre-1707) for Lincoln